Baby Snatcher is a 1992 American made-for-television drama film starring Veronica Hamel, Nancy McKeon and directed by Joyce Chopra based on a true story of the kidnapping of Rachael Ann White.

Release
The film was released in the United States on 3 May 1992, in the Netherlands on 28 September 1994, and in the United Kingdom 16 March 1995.

True story

The film is based on the true story of the kidnapping of Rachael Ann White who was abducted from her grandmothers house on February 19, 1988, in Colorado Springs, Colorado, and recovered four days later.

Lead detectives Sgt Joe Kenda and Sgt Brian Sapp of Homicide Hunter fame.    As seen on Season 7 Episode 20.

Plot
Karen Williams (Nancy McKeon) has to go back to work at the end of maternity leave. Her mother, Ruth (Penny Fuller), is watching the baby for her. The mother is also interviewing people in order to try to find a babysitter for all of Karen's children, including Rachael Ann White, a daughter by a married man, David Anderson (David Duchovny), who used to be Karen's boss.
 
Another couple, Bianca Hudson (Veronica Hamel) and her husband Cal Hudson (Michael Madsen), are having marital problems. He informs her that he has filed for divorce. Bianca had an abortion a few months earlier, for medical reasons. She believes it will save her marriage if she is pregnant again. As Cal is about to leave her, Bianca tells him that she is pregnant again. Bianca fakes the pregnancy, and when it is time for the imaginary baby to be born, she goes out to look for a baby to steal.

A disguised Bianca shows up for an interview for the position of babysitter for Karen's children. When Karen's mother Ruth steps into another room, Bianca walks out with the baby. Bianca goes home with the child and tells her husband that she had gone into labor, so she went to a local hospital, had the baby, and returned home, all in one day.

Karen realizes that Bianca is a suspect, and decides that the best way to find her daughter is to appeal to the media, and put flyers out. Cal's boss and wife make a surprise visit to the Hudson home, where they can plainly see that the baby is much older than four days, and they alert the authorities. Police arrive, arrest Bianca and Cal, and return the baby to its rightful home.

Cast
 Veronica Hamel as Bianca Hudson
 Nancy McKeon as Karen Williams
 Michael Madsen as Cal Hudson
 David Duchovny as David Anderson
 Penny Fuller as Ruth Benson

Ratings
When the movie first aired May 3, 1992, on CBS from 9:00 until 10:30 pm, the movie followed 60 minutes and Murder, She Wrote, receiving a 16.3 rating and a 26 share. This beat ABC, FOX, and NBC for the time-slot.

References

External links 
 
Homicide Hunter 

1992 television films
1992 films
1992 drama films
American films based on actual events
CBS network films
Films directed by Joyce Chopra
American drama television films
1990s English-language films
1990s American films